Mark Simon Taylor (born 8 November 1974) is an English former footballer who played as a left back in the Football League for Darlington, Fulham and Northampton Town. He began his career with Middlesbrough, but never played for them in the League, and also played non-league football for Netherfield.

References 

1974 births
Living people
People from Saltburn-by-the-Sea
English footballers
Association football defenders
Middlesbrough F.C. players
Darlington F.C. players
Fulham F.C. players
Northampton Town F.C. players
Kendal Town F.C. players
English Football League players
Footballers from Yorkshire